Tiago Filipe Alves Araújo (born 27 March 2001) is a Portuguese professional footballer who plays as a winger for Estoril.

Playing career
On 4 April 2019, Araújo signed a contract with S.L. Benfica. He made his professional debut with Benfica B in a 3–2 LigaPro win over U.D. Vilafranquense on 13 September 2020. On 21 November 2020, he made his first team debut in a 1–0 cup win over Paredes.

References

External links
 
 
 

2001 births
Living people
People from Póvoa de Varzim
Portuguese footballers
Portugal youth international footballers
Association football wingers
S.L. Benfica B players
F.C. Arouca players
G.D. Estoril Praia players
Primeira Liga players
Liga Portugal 2 players
Sportspeople from Porto District